Marah Strauch is an American filmmaker. She has produced, written, and directed documentaries which include Vice Versa:Chyna and Sunshine Superman. Her work on Sunshine Superman earned her an award for Best New Director at the 2015 Portland International Film Festival.

Filmography

Film

Television

References

External links
 Official website
 

Year of birth missing (living people)
Living people
American documentary film directors
American documentary film producers
American women television directors
American television directors
American women television producers
American women documentary filmmakers